Lost Lake is a lake in the Desolation Wilderness in the Sierra Nevada, south of Lake Tahoe in El Dorado County, California, United States.

Not to be confused with Lost Lake Resort, which is near the Colorado River. Also not to be confused with the 'Lost Lake' off the Cajon Pass, also in California.

See also
List of lakes in California

External links
Lost Lake Watershed

Lakes of El Dorado County, California
Lakes of the Desolation Wilderness
Lakes of California
Lakes of Northern California